Faenius is a Roman nomen, sometimes confused with Fenius.

 Faenius Rufus, praetorian prefect under Nero
 Lucius Faenius Eumenes, mentioned in a vadimonium (legal document) found at Puteoli
 Lucius Faenius Felix, tribune in Britain mentioned several times in inscriptions.

Faenii